Domousnice is a municipality and village in Mladá Boleslav District in the Central Bohemian Region of the Czech Republic. It has about 300 inhabitants.

Administrative parts
The village of Skyšice is an administrative part of Domousnice.

References

Villages in Mladá Boleslav District